Pangri Zampa Monastery is a Buddhist monastery in Bhutan.

Buddhist monasteries in Bhutan
Tibetan Buddhist monasteries
Tibetan Buddhism in Bhutan